The following is a list of United States ambassadors, or other chiefs of mission, to Costa Rica. On February 16, 2022, Cynthia Telles was sworn in as the 60th ambassador to the Republic of Costa Rica.

See also
Costa Rica – United States relations
Foreign relations of Costa Rica
Ambassadors of the United States

References

 
United States Department of State: Background notes on Costa Rica

External links
 United States Department of State: Chiefs of Mission for Costa Rica
 United States Department of State: Costa Rica
 United States Embassy in San Jose

Costa Rica
Main
United States